Brothers is a 2017 Dutch drama film directed by Hanro Smitsman. In July 2018, it was one of nine films shortlisted to be the Dutch entry for the Best Foreign Language Film at the 91st Academy Awards, but it was not selected.

Cast
 Achmed Akkabi as Hassan
 Walid Benmbarek as Mourad
 Bilal Wahib as Yasin
 Ghalia Takriti as Suha

References

External links
 

2017 films
2017 drama films
Dutch drama films
2010s Dutch-language films